Ermenegildo "Jilly" Rizzo (May 6, 1917 – May 6, 1992) was an American restaurateur and entertainer.

Career
As a young man, Rizzo worked with his father delivering Italian ice to cafes. Rizzo opened Jilly's Saloon, a lounge on West 49th Street, then moved to 256 West 52nd Street at the intersection with Eighth Avenue in Manhattan. Jilly's Saloon was a popular celebrity hangout in the 1960s. Rizzo's long-time friend Frank Sinatra frequented the lounge. Rizzo later became one of Sinatra's chief aides, and was even referenced in Sinatra's adapted lyrics for "Mrs. Robinson" to avoid using the name "Jesus". Rizzo was also a frequent guest on Rowan and Martin's Laugh-In, where he would recite one liners in his monotone New York accent.

In 1990, Rizzo and five other men were convicted of fraud in relation to an $8 million loan scheme. He was given 1,000 hours of community service in a case presided over by judge Jack B. Weinstein.

Death

Rizzo was killed by a drunk driver in Rancho Mirage, CA on his 75th birthday, May 6, 1992. He is buried in Desert Memorial Park in Cathedral City, California.

Filmography

See also
 The Night We Called It a Day

References

External links
 

1917 births
1992 deaths
American male film actors
American people of Italian descent
American restaurateurs
Burials at Desert Memorial Park
Businesspeople from New York City
Road incident deaths in California
20th-century American male actors
20th-century American musicians
20th-century American businesspeople
Television personalities from New York City